The Little Dan River is a river in the United States states of Virginia and North Carolina.

See also
List of rivers of Virginia

References
USGS Geographic Names Information Service
USGS Hydrologic Unit Map - State of Virginia (1974)

Rivers of Virginia
Tributaries of the Roanoke River